EFI Automotive, previously Electricfil, is a French manufacturer of automotive engines and powertrain sensors. The company is headquartered in Beynost, France, and has factories in Turkey, China, and the United States.

History 
Electricfil was created in La Boisse by Johanny Thollin (1889-962)) in 1936 with the assistance of his stepfather Joseph Guinet. He was mayor of La Boisse from the year 1908 to 1938. He was then the head of a small Braided Fabric electrical cable factory in La Boisse and in 1968 the company relocated to Beynost. In the 1970s, the company gradually diversified its activities, abandoning electrical cables for the design of sensors for the rapidly growing automobile field. Subsequently, the company bought several other production centers in various locations.

The company announced in 2021 that they would have a turnover of 202 million euros for the whole company (around 1,700 employees).

In 2015, the company announced the creation of an incubator for innovative start-ups.

In 2021, the company announced the acquisition of the Akeoplus company. This year has been as well the occasion to celebrate its 85th anniversary with all its subsidiaries.

References

Automotive companies of France
Companies based in Auvergne-Rhône-Alpes